Andrea Gay Coss (born 6 November 1960) is an Australian rower. She competed in the women's single sculls event at the 1992 Summer Olympics.

References

External links
 

1960 births
Living people
Australian female rowers
Olympic rowers of Australia
Rowers at the 1992 Summer Olympics
People from the National Capital District (Papua New Guinea)